Vjetar s Dinare (Wind from the Dinara) is an album of the Croatian singer Thompson. It was released in 1998. The opening track Zaustavi se vjetre plays out as a conversation between Thompson and the Dinaric winds, sung by a Dalmatian klapa, in which Thompson begs the winds to tell him about his family. Prijatelji, or "Friends", is a song about reminiscence of wartime friends, and deals with topics of post-war delusion feelings of veterans.

The song Lijepa li si, or "You are beautiful", is a patriotic song which takes its name from the popular domestic name for Croatia, "Lijepa Naša" ("Our Beautiful Homeland"), the title of the country's national anthem. Ej, haj, pjesme naše talks about the power of music.

Track listing

1998 albums
Thompson (band) albums